Lužani is a Slavic place name. It may refer to:

Lužani, Croatia, a village in the Brod-Posavina County
Lužani (Gradiška), Bosnia and Herzegovina
Lužani (Prnjavor), Bosnia and Herzegovina
Lužani (Derventa), Bosnia and Herzegovina
Lužani (Gornji Vakuf), Bosnia and Herzegovina
Lužani (Sanski Most), Bosnia and Herzegovina
Lužani, Montenegro
Lužani Novi, Bosnia and Herzegovina
Lužani Bosanski, Bosnia and Herzegovina
Lužani (tribe), a medieval tribe in present-day Montenegro

See also
 Luzan (disambiguation)
 Lužany (disambiguation), several places in Czech Republic and Slovakia